The 1988–89 Scottish First Division season was won by Dunfermline Athletic, who were promoted two points ahead of Falkirk. Kilmarnock and Queen of the South were relegated to the Second Division.

Table

References

1988-1989
2
Scot